Moghuiyeh (also Romanized as Moghū’īyeh and Maghū’īyeh; also known as Magū, Moghū, Moqū’īyeh, and Mūku) is a village in Sarcheshmeh Rural District, in the Central District of Rafsanjan County, Kerman Province, Iran. At the 2006 census, its population was 26, in 11 families.

References 

Populated places in Rafsanjan County